Southern Crescent Technical College is a public community college with two main campuses in Georgia, one in Griffin and one in Thomaston.  The McDonough campus of the Henry County Center has the second-largest student enrollment behind the Griffin campus. It also has centers in Jackson, Monticello and Butler.

Southern Crescent offers programs of study in the areas of business, health, industrial, and public service with choices of associate degrees, diplomas, and technical certificates of credit. It serves Butts, Fayette, Henry, Jasper, Lamar, Pike, Spalding, Talbot, Taylor, and Upson counties.

The college originated from the merger of Griffin Technical College and Flint River Technical College. The merger of these technical schools was approved by the Southern Association of Colleges and Schools Commission on Colleges on Dec. 7th 2009.

References

External links
 Official website

Technical College System of Georgia
Educational institutions established in 1963
Education in Spalding County, Georgia
Education in Upson County, Georgia
Education in Butts County, Georgia
Education in Jasper County, Georgia
Education in Taylor County, Georgia
Buildings and structures in Griffin, Georgia
Buildings and structures in Upson County, Georgia
1963 establishments in Georgia (U.S. state)
Universities and colleges accredited by the Southern Association of Colleges and Schools